Benbaun is a mountain in County Galway, Ireland. Benbaun is situated at the centre of the core massif of the Twelve Bens mountain range in the Connemara National Park  and is the tallest mountain of the Twelve Bens range, and the county top for Galway.

Naming 
According to Irish academic Paul Tempan, the "white peak" in the Irish language name derives from the abundance of quartzite rock in the summit of Benbaun.  Tempan notes that Benbaun is the "Mont Blanc" of Connemara.

Geography 
Benbaun is the highest mountain of the Twelve Bens range, which is situated in the Connemara National Park in west Galway.  Benbaun lies at the centre of the range and is situated in the middle of a long east-west ridge that to the west includes the major Bens of Benfree , Muckanaght , and Bencullagh , and the minor Ben of Maumonght , and its subsidiary peak of Maumonght SW Top .  To the east is a long flat 3.5-kilometre ridge at the end of which lies the minor Ben of Knockpasheemore  to the far eastern end.

A deep col to the south, known as Maumina, connects Benbaun to the summit of Bencollaghduff , and to the southern Bens of the "Glencoaghan Horseshoe" which forms around the Glencoaghan River.
 
 
Benbaun sits at the apex of two major glaciated U-shaped valleys.  To the east is the Gleninagh Valley, from which the Gleninagh river flows.  This valley is bounded by two large long north-easterly rocky spurs, and the southern spur contains "Carrot Ridge", an important area for rock-climbing in the Bens, with climbs varying from Diff (D) to Very Severe (VS) and ranging from 150 to 320 metres in length.  To the south-west is the large valley of the Owenglin river which is bounded by several major Bens on each of its sides.

Benbaun's prominence of  qualifies it as a P600, and a Marilyn, and it also ranks it as the 41st-highest mountain in Ireland on the MountainViews Online Database, 100 Highest Irish Mountains, where the minimum prominence threshold is 100 metres.

Hill walking 

The most straightforward route to climb Benbaun either via the pass of Maumina by walking up the Gleninagh valley, or by staying on higher ground by first summiting Knockpasheemore and then traversing the 3.5-kilometre ridge to the summit; both routes total over 9-kilometres and 4–5 hours of walking.

Because Benbaun lies off the very popular 16–kilometre 8–9 hour Glencoaghan Horseshoe, it gets fewer visits despite being the tallest Ben in the range. However, Benbaun sits close to the apex of three other well-regarded "horseshoe climbs" of equivalent difficulty in the Bens:

Gallery

Bibliography

See also

Twelve Bens
Mweelrea, major range in Killary Harbour
Maumturks, major range in Connemara
List of Irish counties by highest point
Lists of mountains in Ireland
Lists of mountains and hills in the British Isles
List of P600 mountains in the British Isles
List of Marilyns in the British Isles
List of Hewitt mountains in England, Wales and Ireland

References

External links
MountainViews: The Irish Mountain Website, Benbaun
MountainViews: Irish Online Mountain Database
The Database of British and Irish Hills , the largest database of British Isles mountains ("DoBIH")
Hill Bagging UK & Ireland, the searchable interface for the DoBIH

Marilyns of Ireland
Hewitts of Ireland
Mountains and hills of County Galway
Highest points of Irish counties
Mountains under 1000 metres